Juan Méndez (born September 23, 1981) is a professional basketball player who played for the Niagara University men's university basketball team from 2001 to 2005. He is currently assistant coach on the Redmen Basketball Team. Born in Montreal, Quebec, from Dominican parents, Mendez played with the Canadian national basketball team as well as in several different professional teams overseas.

Career Highs
Juan entered his senior year with over 1,500 career points.  This put him close to Calvin Murphy on Niagara's all time lists. Juan is also the highest scoring Canadian in NCAA Division 1 history.
In 2014, Juan was inducted into the MAAC Naismith Hall of Fame (1st Canadian) in Springfield, Massachusetts, USA.

Professional career
After graduating college, Mendez built his professional career as a player overseas.
He has also been a member of the Team Canada from summers 2003 to 2008. During his time with the team, he participated in the NBA summer league in 2003, averaging 11.4 PPG in 5 games. He participated in the 2003 Pan American Games and finished in 2nd place at Four Nations Tournament in China and Brazil in 2004. He also averaged 16.5 points and 8.5 rebounds per game at the 2005 Americas Championship and 8.9 points and 4.1 rebounds per game during the 2007 Americas Championship.

See also
List of NCAA Division I men's basketball players with 2000 points and 1000 rebounds

External links
http://basketballbuzz.ca/article/juan-mendez-canadas-best-kept-secret/
http://www.writers.net/writers/books/27845
http://www.nba.com/raptors/news/Canadian_Juan_Mendez_Works_Out-142868-71.html
http://www.tvasports.ca/2012/12/12/juan-mendez--le-joueur-de-basketball-globe-trotter
https://maacsports.com/news/2014/2/27/209419821.aspx

1981 births
Living people
Basketball players at the 2003 Pan American Games
Basketball players from Montreal
BC Dnipro players
Black Canadian basketball players
Canadian expatriate basketball people in Greece
Canadian expatriate basketball people in Italy
Canadian expatriate basketball people in the United States
Canadian expatriate sportspeople in Israel
Canadian people of Dominican Republic descent
Sportspeople of Dominican Republic descent
Ironi Nahariya players
Maccabi Rishon LeZion basketball players
Montreal Jazz players
Niagara Purple Eagles men's basketball players
Pallacanestro Trapani players
Pan American Games competitors for Canada
Panellinios B.C. players
Xinjiang Flying Tigers players
Power forwards (basketball)